is a railway station on the Yahiko Line in the village of Yahiko, Niigata, Japan, operated by East Japan Railway Company (JR East).

Lines
Yahiko Station is the terminus of the Yahiko Line, and is 17.4 kilometers from opposing terminus of the line at Higashi-Sanjō Station.

Station layout

The station has a single ground-level side platform.

The station has a Midori no Madoguchi staffed ticket office. Suica farecards can be used at this station.

History
The station opened on 16 October 1916. With the privatization of Japanese National Railways (JNR) on 1 April 1987, the station came under the control of JR East.

Passenger statistics
In fiscal 2017, the station was used by an average of 210 passengers daily (boarding passengers only).

Surrounding area
Yahiko Shrine
Yahiko Post Office
Mount Yahiko
Yahikoyama Ropeway
Yahiko Velodrome

See also
 List of railway stations in Japan

References

External links

 JR East station information 

Railway stations in Niigata Prefecture
Railway stations in Japan opened in 1916
Stations of East Japan Railway Company
Yahiko Line
Yahiko, Niigata